Rudan (also Romanized as Rūdān; also, Dehbarez, also Romanized as Deh Bārez, Deh Bāriz, and Deh Dāriz; also Qal‘eh-ye Deh Bārez, Qal‘eh-ye Deh-e Bārez, and Rūgan) is a city and capital of Rudan County, Hormozgan Province, Iran. At the 2006 census, its population was 30,060, in 6,302 families.

References 

Populated places in Rudan County
Cities in Hormozgan Province